Maulana Yusuf Stadium (Stadion Maulana Yusuf) is the name of a football stadium in the city of Serang, Banten, Indonesia. It was named after the third Sultan of Banten  is used as the home venue for Perserang Serang of the Liga Indonesia. The stadium has a capacity of 15,000. The stadium was built in 1983.

References

External links
 Stadium information
 Stadion Maulana Yusuf

Serang
Buildings and structures in Banten
Football venues in Indonesia
Sports venues in Banten
Sport in Banten